Francavilla di Sicilia (Sicilian: Francavigghia) is a town and comune in the Metropolitan City of Messina on the island of Sicily, southern Italy.

It has a population of about 3,900 people and is situated in the southern part of the province, close to the northern slopes of Mount Etna.
Neighboring towns and villages include: Antillo, Castiglione di Sicilia, Fondachelli-Fantina, Malvagna, Montalbano Elicona, Motta Camastra, Novara di Sicilia and Tripi.

History
In the vicinity of the town artefacts have been found dating back to the 5th century BC.

In 1092 the Abbey of San Salvatore di Placa was built, and the town grew around it.

On June 20, 1719 a major battle was fought between Spanish and Austrians in the War of the Quadruple Alliance, leaving 8000 dead and wounded.

Main sights

Gole dell'Alcantara, a canyon on the river Alcantara, which over the centuries found its way through the lava stones of Mount Etna and which flows close to the town.
Chiesa dell'Annunziata in the centre of the town.
Convent of the Capuchins, near the cemetery.
Ruins of the medieval castle on the hill above the town.
Archaeological excavations, including ancient Greek findings from the 6th-century BC onwards.

Events
Last Sunday of August: Celebration of Saint Euplio.
December 4: Celebration of the town's patron saint, Saint Barbara.
Good Friday procession (every 4 years)
Nativity Play
Carnival

People
 Gaetano Cipolla: American linguist, educator and author, principal of Legas Publishing

References

External links

Official website 

Municipalities of the Metropolitan City of Messina
Castles in Italy